Per Aspera Ad Astra (USA screen name - Through the Thorns to the Stars; Humanoid Woman) is a 1981 Soviet science fiction film directed by Richard Viktorov and based on a novel by Kir Bulychov.

Plot
In the 23rd century, the starship Pushkin discovers a derelict alien spaceship of unknown origin. The alien craft's crew are identical humanoids created by an advanced cloning process. Most are dead, but one woman is found in a catatonic state. The leader of the mission, scientist Sergei Lebedev, brings her to Earth. He settles her in his house and names her Neeya.

Neeya suffers from memory loss and cannot recall anything of her past. As she adapts to life on Earth, she discovers she has a variety of telekinetic powers. A friend of Lebedev, Prof. Ivanova, begins studying Neeya's neurophysiology and finds a special neurocenter in her brain that can be triggered remotely. Neeya is visiting the beach with Lebedev's son Stepan when Ivanova triggers the system. Neeya loses control of her body and falls into the water. The device also triggers a clear memory of her home planet, where she sees a man explain the purpose of the control system, giving him control over the clones. The flashback ends when Stepan pulls her from the water.

Neeya joins an archaeological expedition, where she has another flashback that reveals she is from the planet Dessa. She returns from the expedition to find that a diplomatic mission from Dessa has just arrived at the spaceport to ask for help from Earth. She learns they will return to Dessa on the Astra, and stows away on the ship. By chance, both Stepan and Prof. Ivanova are also aboard.

The Astra encounters Neeya's ship, identified by the Deesan diplomats as the Gaya. A transmitter for the neuro-command system has been left on, forcing Neeya to teleport aboard without a spacesuit. She manages to disable the signal before passing out, and is rescued by Stepan. One of the diplomats, Rakan, explains that the Gaya was the last ship to leave Dessa. Aboard was Professor Glan, who was building an army of clones and awaiting a signal from rebel forces on the planet that the time was right to return and take over.

The Astra reaches Dessa to find a planet that has been stripped of all minerals, leaving the air and water poisoned. Life on the surface is only possible due to Turanchoks, who runs a gas mask factory out of Glan's former Institute. Turanchoks is unhappy with the presence of the Earth ship, which has the power to clean up the mess and put him out of business. After the humans successfully test a way to clean the air, he poisons the only remaining water supply and blames it on them, inciting a riot. Due to Neeya's intervention, the plan is not wholly successful.

Turanchoks activates one of Glan's control devices and uses it to force Neeya to place a bomb on the Astra. Rakan attempts to stop him, but is stabbed by one of Turanchoks' agents. Near death, Rakan crawls off and releases Glan's last and most deadly experiment, a blob-like mass which begins killing everyone in the lab, including Turanchoks. Outside, Ivanova attempts to take the bomb from Neeya, but is shot by Turanchoks' agent. The shock of her death breaks the control's effect on Neeya. Neeya's powers, aided by the remaining crew of the Astra and the ship's robot, defeat the monster. The Astra leaves for home, leaving Neeya behind on a mended planet.

Variant cuts 
A heavily-edited English-dubbed version, and entitled Humanoid Woman was featured on an nth season episode of Mystery Science Theater 3000. This version had nearly an hour of footage removed.
  
On December 27, 2001, a new restoration directed by Nikolai Viktorov, son of the original film's director, was released as the 20th anniversary edition. The release featured revised special effects by the Paradox company and an all-new soundtrack in Dolby Digital. This incarnation was cut by 25 minutes in order to speed up plot dynamics and to excise Soviet ideological context.

Cast
 Yelena Metyolkina as Neeya
 Uldis Lieldidz as Sergei Lebedev
 Vadim Ledogorov as Cadet Stepan Lebedev
 Yelena Fadeyeva as Maria Pavlovna
 Vatslav Dvorzhetsky as Petr Petrovich
 Nadezhda Semyontsova as Professor Nadezhda Ivanova
 Aleksandr Lazarev as Professor Klimov
 Aleksandr Mikhajlov as Dreier
 Boris Shcherbakov as Navigator Kolotin
 Igor Ledogorov as Ambassador Rakan
 Igor Yasulovich as Torki
 Gleb Strizhenov as Glan
 Vladimir Fyodorov as Turanchoks
 Yevgeni Karelskikh

Dubbing

Notes

References

External links

1981 films
1981 in the Soviet Union
2001 films
Films based on works by Kir Bulychov
Films set in the 23rd century
Space adventure films
Films about cloning
Soviet science fiction drama films
1980s science fiction drama films
2000s Russian-language films
1981 drama films
Films shot in Tajikistan
Films about amnesia
Films set on fictional planets